Handyside Fort is a historical fort located in Kohat, Khyber Pakhtunkhwa, which dates from the era of British colonial rule.

Construction
The fort was built in the British colonial era by the British Indian Army. The fort is named after the Frontier Constabulary combatant, Eric Charles Handyside, who was killed fighting the rebels in 1926. Current commander is Colonel Adnan (as of June 2014).

History
The fort was believed to have been built on the hilltop where Alexander the Great camped with his army before marching towards north. The fort now serves as the headquarters of the IXth division of the Pakistan Army.

See also
 List of forts in Pakistan
 List of cultural heritage sites in Khyber Pakhtunkhwa
 List of cultural heritage sites in Pakistan

References

Archaeological sites in Khyber Pakhtunkhwa
Forts in Khyber Pakhtunkhwa